Type 97 may refer:

Japan
Type 97 motorcycle

Weapons
Type 97 grenade
Type 97 sniper rifle
Type 97 automatic cannon
Type 97 heavy tank machine gun
Type 97 aircraft machine gun
Type 97 81 mm infantry mortar
Type 97 90 mm infantry mortar
Type 97 150 mm Infantry Mortar
Type 97 Chi-Ni medium tank
Type 97 Chi-Ha medium tank
Type 97 ShinHoTo Chi-Ha medium tank
Type 97 Te-Ke tankette, a light tank 
Type 97 torpedo
Type 97 light weight torpedo (G-RX4)
Army Type 97 Command Reconnaissance aircraft Mitsubishi Ki-15
Type 97 Fighter Nakajima Ki-27, a fighter aircraft
Kawanishi Navy Type 97 Flying Boat

China
QBZ-97, Type 95 Automatic Rifle, a bullpup assault rifle manufactured by Arsenal 266
ZBD-97, an infantry fighting vehicle
Hawk Industries Type 97, a military shotgun

Taiwan 
T97 pistol, a copy of the Glock 19 but with a manual safety lever